While there is ample evidence to indicate the health benefits of diets rich in fruits, vegetables, legumes, whole grains and nuts, no specific food has been acknowledged by scientists and government regulatory authorities as providing a health benefit. Current medical research is focused on whether health effects could be due to specific essential nutrients or to phytochemicals which are not defined as essential.

The following is a list of phytochemicals present in commonly consumed foods.

Terpenoids (isoprenoids)

Carotenoids (tetraterpenoids)

Carotenes 
orange pigments
 α-Carotene – to vitamin A .
 β-Carotene – to vitamin A .
 γ-Carotene - to vitamin A, 
 δ-Carotene
 ε-carotene
 Lycopene .
 Neurosporene
 Phytofluene .
 Phytoene .

Xanthophylls 
yellow pigments
 Canthaxanthin .
 β-Cryptoxanthin to vitamin A .
 Zeaxanthin .
 Astaxanthin .
 Lutein .
 Rubixanthin .

Triterpenoid 
 Saponins .
  Oleanolic acid .
  Ursolic acid .
  Betulinic acid .
  Moronic acid

Diterpenes 

Monoterpenes 
 Limonene, .
 Perillyl alcohol .

Steroids 
 Phytosterols .
 Campesterol .
 beta Sitosterol .
 gamma sitosterol
 Stigmasterol .

Phenolic compounds

Natural monophenols 
 Apiole .
 Carnosol .
 Carvacrol .
 Dillapiole .
 Rosemarinol .

Polyphenols

Flavonoids 
red, blue, purple pigments 
 Flavonols
 Quercetin .
 Kaempferol .
 Myricetin .
 Fisetin .
 Rutin .
 Isorhamnetin .
 Flavanones
 Hesperidin .
 Naringenin .
 Silybin .
 Eriodictyol .
 Flavones
 Acacetin .
 Apigenin .
 Chrysin .
 Diosmetin .
 Tangeritin .
 Luteolin .
 Flavan-3-ols (flavanols)
 Catechins .
 (+)-Catechin
 (+)-Gallocatechin
 (−)-Epicatechin
 (−)-Epigallocatechin
 (−)-Epigallocatechin gallate (EGCG) .
 (−)-Epicatechin 3-gallate
 Theaflavin .
 Theaflavin-3-gallate .
 Thearubigins .
 Proanthocyanidins
 Flavanonols
 Anthocyanidins (flavonals) and Anthocyanins  .
 Pelargonidin .
 Peonidin .
 Cyanidin .
 Delphinidin .
 Malvidin .
 Petunidin

Isoflavonoids 
 Isoflavones (phytoestrogens) .
 Daidzein (formononetin) .
 Genistein (biochanin A) .
 Glycitein .
 Isoflavanes
 Isoflavandiols
 Isoflavenes
 Pterocarpans or Coumestans (phytoestrogens)
 Coumestrol .

Aurones

Chalconoids

Flavonolignans 
 Silymarin .

Lignans 
Phytoestrogens .
 Matairesinol .
 Secoisolariciresinol .
 Pinoresinol and lariciresinol  .

Stilbenoids 
Resveratrol .
Pterostilbene .
Piceatannol .
Pinosylvin

Curcuminoids 
 Curcumin (Oxidizes to vanillin) .

Tannins

Hydrolyzable tannins 
Ellagitannins
 Punicalagins  .
 Castalagins
 Vescalagins   .
 Castalins
 Casuarictins
 Grandinins
 Punicalins
 Roburin As
 Tellimagrandin IIs
 Terflavin Bs
Gallotannins	
Digalloyl glucose
1,3,6-Trigalloyl glucose

Condensed tannins 
 Proanthocyanidins .
 Polyflavonoid tannins
 Catechol-type tannins
 Pyrocatecollic type tannins
 Flavolans

Phlorotannins 

Flavono-ellagitannin 

Aromatic acid

Phenolic acids 
 Salicylic acid .
 Vanillin and Vanillic acid .
 Gallic acid .
 Ellagic acid .
 Tannic acid .

Hydroxycinnamic acids 
 Caffeic acid .
 Chlorogenic acid .
 Cinnamic acid .
 Ferulic acid .
 Coumarin .

Phenylethanoids 
 Tyrosol .
 Hydroxytyrosol .
 Oleocanthal .
 Oleuropein .

Others 
 Capsaicin .
 Gingerol .
 Alkylresorcinols .
 Piperine .

Glucosinolates

The precursor to isothiocyanates
 Sinigrin (the precursor to allyl isothiocyanate) .
 Glucotropaeolin (the precursor to benzyl isothiocyanate)
 Gluconasturtiin (the precursor to phenethyl isothiocyanate)
 Glucoraphanin (the precursor to sulforaphane) .

Aglycone derivatives
 Dithiolthiones (isothiocyanates)
 Sulforaphane .
Allyl isothiocyanate
Phenethyl Isothiocyanate
Benzyl Isothiocyanate
Oxazolidine-2-thiones
Nitriles
Thiocyanates

Organosulfides/ Organosulfur compounds 
 Polysulfides (allium compounds)
 Allyl methyl trisulfide .
Sulfides
 Diallyl disulfide .
 Allicin .
 Alliin .
 Allyl isothiocyanate .
 Syn-propanethial-S-oxide .

Indoles
 Indole-3-carbinol . 
 3,3'-Diindolylmethane or DIM .
 Indole-3-acetic acid  Commonly occurring plant hormone, a part of the auxin family.

Betalains
 Betacyanins .
 betanin 
 isobetanin 
 probetanin 
 neobetanin 
 Betaxanthins (non glycosidic versions)
 Indicaxanthin .
 Vulgaxanthin .

Chlorophylls
Chlorophyllin: .

Other organic acids 

Saturated cyclic acids
 Phytic acid (inositol hexaphosphate) .
 Quinic acid
 Oxalic acid .
 Tartaric acid .
 Anacardic acid .
 Malic acid .
 Caftaric acid .
 Coutaric acid .
 Fertaric acid

Amines 
 Betanin .

Carbohydrates

Monosaccharides 
Hexose .
Pentose .

Polysaccharides 
Beta-glucan
Chitin .
Lentinan .
Fructan
Inulins .
Lignin .
Pectins .

Protease inhibitors 
 Protease inhibitors .

See also
Nutrient
Essential nutrient
List of macronutrients
List of micronutrients
List of food additives
Underweight

References 

Chemistry-related lists

Lists of foods by ingredient